Leland Bartlett "Shorty" Elness (May 10, 1906 – November 3, 1965) was an American football halfback and quarterback who played one season in the National Football League (NFL) for the Chicago Bears. He played college football for Bradley.

Early life and education
Elness was born on May 10, 1906, in Windom, Minnesota. He attended Windom High School there, before playing college football at Bradley. Though he did not see action as a freshman, he made the varsity team as a sophomore in 1926. At five feet, eight inches tall, Elness was nicknamed "Shorty" by teammates. As a senior, he was considered the team's top player, earning first-team all-conference honors at the end of the season by Associated Press. He later was named conference Most Valuable Player. His profile in Associated Press said the following:

Professional career
After his MVP season, Elness was signed to play professional football by the Chicago Bears of the National Football League (NFL). As a member of the Bears, he appeared in four games as a halfback and quarterback, wearing number 11. He played the 1930 season as a member of the semi-professional Milwaukee Badgers/Eagles, scoring a touchdown in a game versus the Chicago Mills.

Later life and death
After his playing career Elness became a teacher in Minnesota, and was named Charles City High School industrial arts teacher and assistant athletics coach in 1942. He later was director of the trades industries and instructor in cabinet making. He died on November 3, 1965, in Charles City, Iowa, from a heart attack. He was 59 at the time of his death.

References

1906 births
1965 deaths
Players of American football from Minnesota
Bradley Braves football players
American football halfbacks
American football quarterbacks
Chicago Bears players